Grip Stand Throw is the debut album released by the Filipino alternative rock band Sandwich in 1999. The band gained popularity because of its hit carrier single, "Butterfly Carnival". The album and the band won numerous awards due to the album. The album was also produced during Raimund Marasigan's tenure with the Eraserheads.

Accolades

* denotes an unordered list

Track listing

Personnel

 Marc Abaya - vocals, guitar, unclean vocals
 Raimund Marasigan – vocals, guitar, keyboards, synths, loops
 Diego Castillo - guitar, backup vocals
 Myrene Academia - bass
 Mike Dizon - drums

Album Credits
Executive Producer: Rudy Y. Tee
A & R: Vic Valenciano & Romel Sanchez
Recorded, Mixed, Edited & Mastered at: Tracks Studios
Additional Recording by: Sancho & Raymund
Mixed by: Sancho And Angee Rozul

References

External links
 ERASERHEADS Database
 Sandwich's EMI page

1999 debut albums
Sandwich (band) albums